The beltzak (blacks in basque language) are the police officers that compose the riot unit of the Ertzaintza, who is the police force of the Basque Country, one of the autonomous communities of Spain. An Ertzaintza member is an ertzaina.

They are called beltzak because of their black fire-proof uniforms.

Basque Country (autonomous community)
Law enforcement in Spain